Highway 41 (AR 41, Hwy. 41) is a designation for two state highways in Western Arkansas. One route of  runs from Franklin County Route 40 (CR 40) south to Highway 23 near Chismville. A second routing begins at US Route 70B (US 70B) in De Queen and runs south to Texas State Highway 8 at the Texas state line. The northern segment of Highway 41 contains a  officially designated exception over Highway 22 in Branch.

Both routes are maintained by the Arkansas Department of Transportation (ArDOT). A former alignment of Highway 41 existed as Highway 41 Business, a business route in De Queen for twelve years, until it was transferred to city maintenance in 1992.

Route description

County Route 40 to Chismville

The route begins near the Arkansas River at a United States Army Corps of Engineers park called Citadel Bluff. Highway 41 runs south to a junction with Highway 96 in Cecil and continues to wind further south to Peter Pender, where the route has junctions with Highway 288 and Highway 60. South of these junctions Highway 41 serves as the western terminus for Highway 398 north of Branch. Upon entering Branch, Highway 41 forms an officially designated exception in which it shares the same strip of pavement with Highway 22 for  westbound. The route turns left and runs south into Logan County, where the route terminates at Highway 23 near Chismville. Traffic counts from the Arkansas State Highway and Transportation Department (AHTD) reveal that no more than 800 vehicles per day (VPD) used Highway 41 along its routing from Citadel Bluff to Highway 23.

De Queen to Texas
AR 41 begins at US 70 Business and Highway 329 in De Queen and runs south to a junction with Highway 24 near Horatio. These two routes form a concurrency through Horatio which ends when Highway 24 at Williams Street with Highway 41 continuing southwest past the Pond Creek National Wildlife Refuge into Little River County. Upon crossing the Little River the highway has a junction with Highway 380 at Billingsly's Corner before winding south to cross Highway 234 at Cross Roads. The route becomes a section line road and continues along this line into Foreman where the route becomes Madden Street. Highway 41 intersects Highway 32 and Highway 108, and continues south in a brief overlap with Highway 32. This overlap concludes shortly south of town and Highway 41 continues along the section line due south to meet the Red River at the Texas state line, where it becomes State Highway 8.

Major intersections

History

Highway 41 was created during the 1926 Arkansas state highway numbering. The original route was established between De Queen and Texas and has remained largely unchanged. A second segment was created between Highway 96 in Cecil to and Highway 22 in Branch in 1953. The Arkansas State Highway Commission extended the route to Chismville on June 23, 1965. The Highway 41 designation was extended to the current northern terminus at Citadel Bluff Park on September 25, 1968. Road construction in Foreman led to a minor alignment change in 1970, with the Highway 41 designation moving from 10th Avenue, Schuman Street, and Bell Street to the newly constructed Madden Street. A similar realignment took place in De Queen in 1980; with Highway 41 being rerouted away from the historic city center to a newly constructed roadway.

De Queen business route

The highway ran from Highway 41 south of De Queen to US 70 Business.

The highway was a former alignment of Highway 41, retained in the state highway system following a rerouting of the parent route. It was deleted on February 19, 1992 by the Arkansas State Highway Commission at the request of the Mayor of De Queen, with the city accepting maintenance responsibilities.

Major intersections

See also

Notes

References

External links

041
Transportation in Franklin County, Arkansas
Transportation in Little River County, Arkansas
Transportation in Logan County, Arkansas
Transportation in Sevier County, Arkansas